American rapper and singer Post Malone is the recipient of multiple awards including three American Music Awards, ten Billboard Music Awards and a MTV Video Music Award.

Post Malone received his first Grammy Award nominations at the 61st annual ceremony, with "Rockstar" being nominated for both Record of the Year and Best Rap/Sung Performance while "Better Now" garnered a nomination in Best Pop Solo Performance. Additionally, his studio album Beerbongs & Bentleys nabbed a nomination for Album of the Year. At the 62nd annual ceremony, his collaboration with Swae Lee, "Sunflower", received nominations in categories such as Record of the Year and Best Pop Duo/Group Performance.

Awards and nominations

Notes

References

Malone, Post
Awards and nominations